Dot plot may refer to:

 Dot plot (bioinformatics), for comparing two sequences
 Dot plot (statistics), data points on a simple scale
  Dot plot graphic for Federal Reserve Open Market Committee polling result